The Carers Trust is a charity in the United Kingdom which supports carers. It works with a network of partner organisations to help carers with the challenges of their caring roles.

History 
The Princess Royal Trust for Carers was created on the initiative of Anne, Princess Royal in the UK in 1991. At that time people caring at home for family members or friends with disabilities and chronic illnesses were scarcely recognised as requiring support.

The Trust was the largest provider of comprehensive carers support services in the UK. Through its unique network of 144 independently managed Carers' Centres, 85 young carers services and interactive websites, The Trust provided quality information, advice and support services to over 400,000 carers, including around 25,000 young carers. In recognition of its work for the welfare and development of young people, the Trust was a member of The National Council for Voluntary Youth Services (NCVYS).

In 2012, the organisation merged with Crossroads Care to form the Carers Trust.

See also
Caregiver
Department of Health and Social Care
Department for Work and Pensions
Department for Children, Schools and Families

References

Further reading
Carers Centre Statistical Survey 1 April 2006 - 31 March 2007. The Princess Royal Trust for Carers. 2007.
State of Social Care 06-06 report. CSCI. London. 2006
It Could be You, the chances of becoming a carer, Carers UK 2001
Securing Good Care for Older People: Taking a long-term view, Wanless, D. London: King's Fun. 2006.
General Household Survey. 2000.
Real change, not short change: Time to deliver for carers, Carers UK, 2007.
National Carers Strategy Consultation; Submission from CLASP Carers Centre in Leicestershire. 2007.
Carers Speak Out The Princess Royal Trust for Carers. London. 2002.
Young Carers in the UK The 2004 Report, Dearden, C and Becker, S. Loughborough University Young carers research group. 2004.
Alcohol Harm Reduction Strategy for England, Home Office. 2004.
Women's Mental Health: Into the Mainstream. Strategic Development of Mental Health Care for Women. London: Department of Health. 2002.
Hidden Harm, Advisory Council on Misuse of Drugs. Home Office. 2003.

External links

The Carers Trust network of services
The National Council for Voluntary Youth Services (NCVYS)

Carers
1991 establishments in the United Kingdom
Organizations established in 1991
Anne, Princess Royal
Social care in the United Kingdom